The 2019–20 Hannover 96 season was the 124th season in the football club's history and 24th overall season in the second flight of German football, the 2. Bundesliga, having been relegated from the Bundesliga in the previous season. Hannover 96 also are participating in this season's edition of the domestic cup, the DFB-Pokal. This is the 61st season for Hannover in the HDI-Arena, located in Hanover, Lower Saxony, Germany. The season covers a period from 1 July 2019 to 30 June 2020.

On 12 March 2020, all players were quarantined for 14 days after Timo Hübers and Jannes Horn were tested positive for COVID-19.

Players

Squad information

Out on loan

Transfers

In

Out

Friendly matches

Competitions

Overview

2. Bundesliga

League table

Results summary

Results by round

Matches

DFB-Pokal

Statistics

Appearances and goals

|}

Goalscorers

Clean sheets

Disciplinary record

Notes

References

Hannover 96 seasons
Hannover 96